Water polo at the World Aquatics Championships is an international water polo tournament held every two years as part of the FINA World Aquatics Championships. The reigning champions are Spain in men's and the United States in women's competition.

Events

Men's tournament

Results summary

Confederation statistics

Best performances by tournament

Team statistics

Participating teams

Finishes in the top four

Medal table

Champions (results and squads)

Player statistics

Multiple gold medalists

Multiple medalists

Women's tournament

Results summary

Confederation statistics

Best performances by tournament

Team statistics

Participating teams

Finishes in the top four

Medal table

Champions (results and squads)

Player statistics

Multiple gold medalists

Multiple medalists

Combined medal table
The following table is pre-sorted by number of gold medals (in descending order), number of silver medals (in descending order), number of bronze medals (in descending order), name of the country (in ascending order), respectively.

Hungary, Italy and Spain are the only three countries to win both the men's and women's water polo tournaments at the World Aquatics Championships.

Legend
 † – Former country

See also
 List of World Aquatics Championships men's water polo tournament records and statistics
 List of World Aquatics Championships women's water polo tournament records and statistics
 List of world champions in men's water polo
 List of world champions in women's water polo
 List of World Aquatics Championships medalists in water polo
 Water polo at the Summer Olympics
 FINA Water Polo World Rankings
 List of water polo world medalists
 Major achievements in water polo by nation

Notes

References

Sources

External links
FINA Water Polo website

 
Water polo
World Aquatics Championships